Audea zimmeri is a moth of the family Erebidae. It is found in the Democratic Republic of Congo (North Kivu, Katanga, Orientale), Eswatini, Ethiopia, South Africa, Tanzania, Uganda and Zimbabwe.

References

Moths described in 1954
Audea
Moths of Africa